Hartzler is a surname. Notable people with the surname include:

Amy Hartzler (born 1981), better known as Amy Lee, American singer-songwriter, musician and record producer
Vicky Hartzler (born 1960), American politician

See also
Hertzler